Al Ewing is a British comics writer who has mainly worked in the small press and for 2000 AD and Marvel Comics.

Career
Al Ewing began his career writing stories in the four-page Future Shocks format for 2000 AD and moved on to regular stints on Judge Dredd (2008–2015), for which his 2010 story "Doctor What?" marked Brendan McCarthy's return to 2000 AD. They later worked together on a new series entitled The Zaucer of Zilk. Ewing worked on Damnation Station and Zombo, the latter illustrated by Henry Flint, which was collected in trade paperback in 2010.

Ewing has also contributed to Solar Wind,  FutureQuake, and The End Is Nigh. He is responsible for the mobile comic Murderdrome, created with P. J. Holden.

In May 2007, Ewing created the comedy blog "The Diary of Ralph Dibney", writing as the titular DC Comics superhero (also known as Elongated Man), Dibney's therapist, or as the even more obscure DC Hero Richard Dragon, as they react to the events of each week's issue of the comic book 52.

Breaking into American comic books, Ewing was also picked by Garth Ennis to provide a six-issue arc on Jennifer Blood, published by Dynamite Entertainment, and a spin-off series The Ninjettes.

His debut prose novel Pax Britannia: El Sombra, published by Abaddon Books in 2007, features a mysterious Mexican hero fighting back against the menace of steam-powered Nazis. It is set in the same Steampunk alternate history as the other novels from the Pax Britannia series. Three other novels have been published since, with a fifth on the way.

Ewing wrote Mighty Avengers and Loki: Agent of Asgard for Marvel Comics and co-wrote the first year of the Eleventh Doctor Doctor Who title with Rob Williams for Titan Comics.

Ewing has since written New Avengers, U.S.Avengers, Ultimates, Rocket, Royals, and The Immortal Hulk, all for Marvel. The Immortal Hulk was a nominee for the 2019 Eisner Award in the "Best Continuing Series" category, and had earned publisher Marvel Comics a Diamond Gem Award the previous year as "Best New Comic Book Series."

In 2021, Ewing won the GLAAD Media Award for Outstanding Comic Book at the 32nd GLAAD Media Awards for his work on Empyre and received an additional nomination in 2021 and one in 2022 for Guardians of the Galaxy. In June 2021, it was announced that Ewing would serve as co-writer of Venom alongside Ram V, with Bryan Hitch serving as artist.

Personal life
At the end of Pride Month 2021, Ewing came out as bisexual.

Selected bibliography

Marvel Comics
Amazing Spider-Man: Full Circle #1 (2019)
Ant-Man and Wasp
Ant-Man #1-4 (2022)
Wasp #1-4 (2023)
Avengers
Avengers Assemble #14-15, 20 (2013)
Mighty Avengers
Mighty Avengers (Vol. 2) #1-14 (2013-2014)
Captain America and the Mighty Avengers #1-9 (2015)
Captain Britain and the Mighty Defenders #1-2 (2015)
Avengers (Vol. 5) #34.1 (2014)
Avengers: Ultron Forever
Avengers: Ultron Forever #1 (2015)
New Avengers: Ultron Forever #1 (2015)
Uncanny Avengers: Ultron Forever #1 (2015)
Ultimates
Ultimates (Vol. 2) #1-12 (2016)
Ultimates 2 (Vol. 2) #1-9, #100 (2017)
New Avengers
New Avengers (Vol. 4) #1-18 (2015-2017)
U.S.Avengers #1-12 (2017-2018)
Avengers #675-690 (2018)
Avengers: No Road Home #1-10 (2019)
Contest of Champions #1-10 (2015-2016)
Crypt of Shadows
Crypt of Shadows (Vol. 2) #1 (2019)
Crypt of Shadows (Vol. 3) #1 (2022)
Defenders
Defenders: The Best Defense #1 (2019)
Defenders (Vol. 6) #1-5 (2021)
Defenders: Beyond #1-5 (2022)
Elektra: Black, White, and Blood #2 (2022)
Empyre
Incoming! #1 (2020)
Empyre #0: Avengers (2020)
Empyre #1-6 (2020)
Empyre Aftermath: Avengers #1 (2020)
Guardians of the Galaxy
Rocket #1-6 (2017)
Guardians of the Galaxy Annual (Vol. 5) #1 (2019)
Guardians of the Galaxy (Vol. 6) #1-18 (2020)
Guardians of the Galaxy Annual (Vol. 6) #1 (2021)
Immortal Hulk
Immortal Hulk #1-50 (2018–2021)
Immortal Hulk: The Best Defense #1 (2019)
Absolute Carnage: Immortal Hulk #1 (2019)
Immortal She-Hulk #1 (2020)
King in Black: Immortal Hulk #1 (2021)
Gamma Flight #1-5 (2021) [Co-plotted with Crystal Frasier]
Immortal Hulk: Time of Monsters #1 (2021) [Co-plotted with Alex Paknadel]
Infinity Warps
Infinity Wars: Iron Hammer #1-2 (2018)
Secret Warps: Arachknight Annual #1 (2019)
Secret Warps: Ghost Panther Annual #1 (2019)
Secret Warps: Weapon Hex Annual #1 (2019)
Secret Warps: Iron Hammer Annual #1 (2019)
Secret Warps: Soldier Supreme Annual #1 (2019)
Inhumans
Civil War II: Ulysses #1-6 (2016)
Inhumans Prime #1 (2017)
Royals #1-12 (2017-2018)
Inhumans: Judgment Day #1 (2018)
Iron Man: Fatal Frontier Infinite Comic #1-13 (2013-2014)
Marvel Comics #1000-1001 (2019)
S.H.I.E.L.D.
Original Sins #5 (2014)
S.H.I.E.L.D. #9 (2015)
Secret Wars Too #1 (2015)
Strange Tales
Strange Tales: Clea, Wong & America Infinity Comic #1 (2022)
Strange Tales: Victor Strange Infinity Comic #1 (2022)
Strange Tales: Rocket Raccoon Infinity Comic #1 (2022)
Thanos Annual #1 (2018)
Thor
Loki: Agent of Asgard #1-17 (2014-2015)
Original Sin #5.1-5.5 (2014)
Valkyrie: Jane Foster #1-7 (2019-2020)
Thor (Vol. 6) #24, 27-28 (2022)
Venom
Carnage: Black, White & Blood #1 (2021)
Venom #1, 5, 8-10 (2021-present)
X-Men
Merry X-Men Holiday Special #1 (2019)
S.W.O.R.D. (Vol. 2) #1-11 (2020–2021)
Cable: Reloaded #1 (2021)
X-Men: Red #1-present (2022)
Storm and the Brotherhood of Mutants #1-3 (2023)
You Are Deadpool #1-5 (2018)

References

Citations

Sources

Al Ewing at Barney

External links

A collection of archived small-press work
Ewing goes to the Movies
 (Note, only covers written speculative fiction, not comics)
The Fictional Man review

Interviews
Interview on 2000ADReview website (NB: Ewing is talking in an assumed persona)
The Man from Death Planet: Matt Badham talks with Al Ewing, Forbidden Planet, 13 May 2009
Interview with comics writer Al Ewing, SFX, 7 July 2009

Living people
British comics writers
1977 births
LGBT comics creators
British LGBT writers
British bisexual writers
Bisexual men
Marvel Comics writers